The women's aerials event in freestyle skiing at the 2014 Winter Olympics in Sochi, Russia took place 14 February 2014.

The gold medal was won by Alla Tsuper, Belarus, the silver medal by Xu Mengtao, China and the bronze medal was won by Lydia Lassila, Australia.

Qualification

An athlete had to have placed in the top 30 in at a World Cup event after July 2012 or at the 2013 World Championships and a minimum of 80 FIS points. A total of 25 quota spots were available to athletes to compete at the games. A maximum of 4 athletes could be entered by a National Olympic Committee.

After the quotas were awarded and reallocated only 22 out of 25 quota spots were distributed.

Results

Qualification 1
The qualification 1 was held at 17:45.

Qualification 2
The qualification 2 was held at 18:30.

Finals
The finals were started at 21:30.

References

Women's freestyle skiing at the 2014 Winter Olympics